The sexual abuse scandal in Phoenix diocese is a significant episode in the series of Catholic sex abuse cases in the United States.

Grand jury investigation
In 2002, Maricopa County attorney Rick Romley, launched a grand jury investigation into cases of sexual abuse of minors by priests and a cover-up of those crimes by Bishop Thomas J. O'Brien, in the Roman Catholic Diocese of Phoenix. The investigation resulted in evidence of priestly abuse, including a 1979 case in which Bishop O'Brien learned of accusations that a priest had molested a 10-year-old boy and later transferred the same priest to another parish, where his abusive behavior continued.

Plea agreement
On June 2, 2003, O'Brien and Romley reached a plea agreement, avoiding possible criminal charges in exchange for admitting that he "allowed priests under his supervision to have contact with minors after becoming aware of allegations of criminal sexual misconduct" and acknowledging "transferring offending priests to situations where children could be further victimized."

Diminished authority
The agreement vastly diminished O'Brien's authority in the diocese, forcing him to appoint a priest to oversee the Phoenix diocese's sexual abuse policies as well as an independent youth protection advocate to report allegations about priests without requiring the consent of any diocesan personnel. O'Brien also agreed to create a church fund to pay for counseling and treatment of those sexually assaulted by priests during his tenure.

Dale Fushek affair
In May 2002, Priest Dale Fushek disclosed to his congregation, that in 1995 the Diocese of Phoenix had settled a sexual harassment suit that had been filed against him by a former Life Teen staff member. In April 2004, the newly installed Bishop Thomas Olmsted, who replaced Bishop Thomas O'Brien after his conviction and resignation for a fatal hit-and-run accident  accepted Fushek's resignation from his position as Vicar General.

In late December 2004, additional complaints against Fushek emerged and the Diocese of Phoenix began to conduct an investigation.  Fushek was placed on paid administrative leave shortly thereafter.

Paul LeBrun affair
Also in November 2005 Father Paul LeBrun was found guilty of six counts in the sexual abuse of boys when he was stationed in the West Valley.  He received a 111-year sentence in January 2006.

Joseph Briceno affair
Father Joseph Briceno fled to Mexico and was later captured and charged with one count of sexual abuse, six counts of sexual conduct with a minor and one count of attempted sexual conduct with a minor. He later pleaded guilty in October 2006 to having sex with a teenage boy in 1983. He received a two-year sentence in December 2006.

Mark Lehman affair
In December 2006 the Catholic Diocese of Phoenix agreed to pay $100,000 to William Cesolini who claimed he was sexually assaulted as a teenager by a priest, Mark Lehman, and a former teen minister, Phil Baniewicz, at a Mesa church. Monsignor Dale Fushek, who was pastor of that parish and co-founded Life Teen, the nation's largest Catholic youth ministry with Baniewicz, was accused in the suit of giving alcohol to the teen and then watching Lehman sexually abuse Cesolini.

Thomas O'Brien affair
On August 4, 2017, it was announced that a civil lawsuit was filed against Thomas J. O'Brien, who served as Bishop of the Catholic Diocese of Phoenix between the years 1982 to 2003, O'Brien is accused of sexually molested a boy on several occasions at parishes in Phoenix and Goodyear from 1977 to 1982. O'Brien died on August 26, 2018, following complications from Parkinson's Disease.

Joseph J. Henn affair

In June 2019, Joseph J. Henn, a former priest, was extradited from Italy to face charges of molestation in Phoenix. He had been laicized and expelled from the Salvatorian order in 2006.

Thomas Spaulding affair
On February 25, 2020, indicted Diocese of Phoenix priest Thomas Spaulding, who was accused of sexually abusing at least two boys in Maricopa County, died awaiting trial. Spaulding, who was 75 years old when he died, was charged in January 2020 with six counts of sexual misconduct and one charge of child molestatation.

See also
Charter for the Protection of Children and Young People
Essential Norms
National Review Board
Pontifical Commission for the Protection of Minors

References

External links
Audits, Child And Youth Protection; US Conference of Catholic Bishops
Charter For The Protection Of Children And Young People; US Conference of Catholic Bishops
Child And Youth Protection; US Conference of Catholic Bishops
National Review Board,  Child And Youth Protection; US Conference of Catholic Bishops
Safe Environment, Child And Youth Protection; US Conference of Catholic Bishops
Victim Assistance, Child And Youth Protection; US Conference of Catholic Bishops

Catholic Church sexual abuse scandals in the United States
Incidents of violence against boys
Violence against men in North America